Hemant Karkare AC (12 December 1954 – 27 November 2008) was the chief of the Mumbai Anti-Terrorist Squad (ATS). He was killed in action during the 2008 Mumbai attacks. In 2009, he was posthumously given the Ashoka Chakra, India's highest peacetime gallantry decoration.

Karkare succeeded K. P. Raghuvanshi as the Chief of ATS in January 2008 and was eventually succeeded by Raghuvanshi after he was shot dead on 26 November 2008. He was credited with solving the serial bombing cases in Thane, Vashi and Panvel, and led the investigation of the 2008 Malegaon blasts.

Early life
Hemant Karkare was born in a Maharashtrian Brahmin family.

Education and career
Karkare did his primary schooling from Chittranjan Das Municipal Primary School, Wardha and then received his middle school and high school education from New English High School,Nagpur.  He obtained a Bachelor of Engineering degree in Mechanical Engineering from Visvesvaraya National Institute of Technology, Nagpur in 1975. After graduation he worked for the National Productivity Council of the Government of India and then Hindustan Lever Limited (now called Hindustan Unilever Ltd.), India's largest FMCG company.

Police service

Karkare joined the Indian Police Service (IPS) as a member of the 1982 batch (35RR). Before becoming ATS Chief of Maharashtra State in January 2008, he was Joint Commissioner of Police (Administration) of Mumbai Police. He served seven years in Austria in the Research and Analysis Wing (RAW), India's external intelligence agency.
According to former senior Mumbai Police officer Y.C. Pawar, Mr. Karkare was regarded as very influential officer in police circles.

Malegaon investigation
On 8 September 2006, a series of bomb blasts took place in Malegaon, Maharashtra.
On 29 September 2008, three bombs exploded in Modasa, Gujarat and Malegaon, Maharashtra killing eight people, and injuring 80. Several unexploded bombs were found in Ahmedabad, Gujarat. 
Hemant Karkare, as the chief of the state Anti-Terror Squad, led the investigation into the 2008 Malegaon blasts. In late October 2008, the ATS arrested eleven suspects, including a former ABVP student leader Sadhvi Pragya Singh Thakur, Swami Amritananda alias Dayanand Pandey, a retired Major Ramesh Upadhyay and a serving Army officer Lt. Col. Prasad Shrikant Purohit.

</ref>
Most of the accused belonged to a Hindutva group called Abhinav Bharat with prior links to Sangh Parivar organisations. Karkare's ATS identified, for the first time, Hindutva organisations as being responsible for terrorism in India, and political commentators began to call it Hindutva terror or Saffron terror.

Opposition parties, including the Bharatiya Janta Party and Shiv Sena, and Hindu organizations alleged that the arrests were made under the pressure of the incumbent radical government, in an attempt to appease India's Muslim population. These parties called him 'a traitor to the nation' for his investigation in this direction.
Narendra Modi, then the Chief Minister of Gujarat, accused the ATS of undermining the military morale.
Some BJP, Rashtriya Swayamsevak Sangh (RSS) and Vishva Hindu Parishad (VHP) leaders accused the ATS of being used as a tool to attack the Sangh Parivar and of using illegal detention and torture. Thakur was given a clean-chit in the chargesheet presented by NIA in 2016 to the court. And the court dropped charges of Maharashtra Control of Organised Crime Act (MCOCA) put by ATS following which she applied for a bail and the Court granted it. The bail order lied that she is "suffering from breast cancer" and was "infirm and cannot even walk without support". Multiple videos of Pragya dancing prove this lie. She is currently facing charges of Unlawful Activities (Prevention) Act and other Indian Penal Code sections and a trial is ongoing as of April 2019. She contested and won the Bhopal seat during the Lok Sabha elections of 2019. He tortured Pragya Thakur while being in Jail along with Parambeer Singh and a few others as alleged by the Pragya Thakur herself.

Death

Karkare, along with senior police officials Ashok Kamte and Vijay Salaskar, were killed outside the Cama Hospital after Pakistani terrorist wing opened fire on their police van.

At 9.45 p.m. on 26 November 2008, while having his dinner at his Dadar residence, he received a call about a terrorist attack at Chatrapati Shivaji Terminus (C.S.T.) station. He switched on the TV for news and left at once with his driver and bodyguards for C.S.T. There he donned a bullet-proof vest and helmet (shown on news channels live), and went to Platform No.1, but found it deserted. He was then informed that the terrorists had moved to the Cama and Albless Hospital ("Cama") next to the Azad Maidan police station.

The operation was difficult as it was dark and the terrorists were well prepared and virtually on a fidayeen mission. The officers, with a few constables, went into Cama from the back. A couple of constables were left stationed at the back entrance of Cama, while the rest boarded a Qualis jeep. Senior Police Inspector Vijay Salaskar asked the driver of the Qualis to let him take over at the wheel. About that time, they heard on the wireless that the terrorists were hiding behind a red car.

As they turned from the Crime Branch office towards Rang Bhavan looking for the red car, near the Corporation Bank ATM, they saw one of the terrorists running. Ashok Kamte, ACP of Mumbai East, or Salaskar – or both – fired, the bullet hitting the terrorist on his arm, his AK-47 fell down. He was Kasab, the lone terrorist captured alive later. As they were thinking of getting down, a second terrorist, Ismail Khan appeared and fired a volley of bullets at them. All but one, Assistant Police Inspector Jadhav, died.

Hemant Karkare, Ashok Kamte, Salaskar and others died in fighting the Mumbai attacks, on 27 November 2008 in a narrow lane between St. Xavier's College and Rang Bhavan, just a stone throw away from the Crime Branch office.

Indian Express quotes statements by Constable Arun Jadhav, who was with the officers Hemant Karkare, Vijay Salaskar and Ashok Kamte when they died.
The three officers and four constables had received information that Sadanand Date had been injured in the gunfire at the Cama and Albless Hospital for women and children. Located at Chhatrapati Shivaji Terminus (CST), a ten-minute drive from the hospital, they took a Toyota Qualis and proceeded in that direction. Salaskar was driving, Kamte in the passenger seat, Karkare in the second row, and the four constables, including Jadhav, were in the back row of seating. According to Jadhav, five minutes later, two terrorists stepped out from behind a tree and opened fire with AK-47 automatic rifles. The six policemen, other than Jadhav, were all killed quickly in the gunfire. Kamte was the sole officer who managed to retaliate, wounding terrorist Ajmal in the arm. The wounded Jadhav had no opportunity to render assistance. The two terrorists approached the vehicle, dumped the bodies of the three officers on the road and, leaving the constables for dead, proceeded to Metro Cinema. Upon arrival, they aimed three bursts of automatic fire at the police and press vehicles drawn up at that location, then drove off towards the government offices (Vidhan Bhawan) in South Mumbai. Here again they fired several times. While attempting to leave the area, one of the tires of the vehicle burst, so the terrorists departed to obtain another. At this point, Jadhav was able to contact headquarters. The bodies of the dead were recovered and taken to St George Hospital.
However the statement that Kasab fired "inside the car" was rejected by the court. The crucial evidence in Karkare's death - the source of bullet fired into his body was absent. The bullets did not match with few of the terrorist's recovered guns which made it impossible to decide who amongst the terrorists killed Hemant Karkare. 
In an investigation, Headline Today, an Indian news agency, found that a substandard bulletproof jacket had been issued to Mr. Karkare. Though, according to the post mortem report, the quality of the vest was not a factor in his death as bullets did not pierce the vest. Concerns in the media about the quality of the vest continue because the vest itself was, according to Indian authorities, misplaced in the hospital. In 2018, the Bombay High Court discarded a pending petition that had claimed that Karkare was not gunned down by terrorists Ajmal Kasab and Abu Ismail.

His widow, Kavita Karkare, suffered a massive brain haemorrhage on 27 September 2014 and soon slipped into coma. Thereafter she died on 29 September 2014, at age of 57. She lived in, Dadar, and was a professor at the NSS B.Ed college, Tardeo, but left work a few months before her death and was suffering from hypertension. The Karkares are survived by their two daughters and a son.

Official version contested

A book The Last Bullet by Vinita Kamte, wife of additional commissioner of police Ashok Kamte, who was killed in the 26/11 strike, alleges the police force ignored crucial information during the terrorist attacks. Vinita claims to have exposed Maria’s ‘feigned ignorance’ about the events unfolding in Rang Bhawan lane. Kamte, Anti-Terrorism Squad chief Hemant Karkare and senior inspector Vijay Salaskar were killed there. Vinita also writes about how Karkare’s repeated pleas for reinforcement to block the passage of the terrorists fleeing Cama Hospital went unheeded for over an hour.

Who Killed Karkare?: The Real Face of Terrorism in India by S. M. Mushrif.  This book was published in October 2009, that is a year after 26/11 Terror Attack, is written by a former senior Maharashtra top cop, with a distinguished career that included unearthing the Telgi scam, peeps behind the propaganda screen, using material mostly in the public domain as well as his long police experience. The Times of India called this book controversial and quoted that the author he had highlighted in his book how former ATS chief Hemant Karkare was killed in a conspiracy hatched by Intelligence Bureau (IB) to pave way for the appointment of their favoured KP Raghuvanshi as ATS chief to thwart investigations against the Hindu hardliners allegedly involved in Malegaon blast of 2006.

See also
 Vijay Salaskar
 Ashok Kamte
 Sadanand Date

References

1954 births
2008 deaths
Deaths by firearm in India
Male murder victims
Terrorism victims in India
Police officers from Mumbai
Indian police officers killed in the line of duty
Victims of the 2008 Mumbai attacks
People from Nagpur
Recipients of the Ashoka Chakra (military decoration)
Marathi people
Indian Police Service officers
Ashoka Chakra